The Twin Falls Bruins were the first minor league baseball team based in Twin Falls, Idaho. From 1926 to 1928, the Twin Falls Bruins played exclusively as members the Class C level Utah-Idaho League, hosting home games at Athletic Park.

The Bruins were succeeded in Twin Falls by the Twin Falls Cowboys, who joined the Pioneer League in 1939.

History
Twin Falls first hosted the semi–pro "Twin Falls Irrigators", who began play in 1905, playing other area teams for many seasons.

Minor League baseball came to Twin Falls in 1926, when the Twin Falls Bruins became charter members of the Class C level Utah-Idaho League. The Bruins joined the Idaho Falls Spuds, Logan Collegians, Ogden Gunners, Pocatello Bannocks and Salt Lake City Bees in the new six–team league.

In their first season of play, the 1926 Twin Falls Bruins ended the season with a record of 63–50, playing under manager Carl Zamloch. The Bruins placed 2nd in the regular season standings, finishing 11.5 games behind the champion Idaho Falls Spuds. The Utah-Idaho League did not have playoffs in 1926.

In 1927, the Bruins placed 6th and last at 40–63 in the Utah-Idaho League under managers Curly Gardiner, Phil Apperson and Bill Leard. Twin Falls finished 18.0 games behind the first place Ogden Gunners and did not qualify for the playoffs that were held.

The Twin Falls Bruins folded during the 1928 season. On July 5, 1928, the Bruins had compiled a record of 29–29 playing under manager Bill Leard when the franchise disbanded.  Fellow Utah-Idaho League member Idaho Falls Spuds disbanded on the same day. The Utah-Idaho League finished the season with four teams and permanently folded after conclusion of the 1928 season.

Minor league baseball returned to Twin Falls in 1939, when the Twin Falls Cowboys became charter members of the six–team Pioneer League.

The ballpark
The Twin Falls Bruins were noted to have played at minor league home games at Twin Falls Athletic Park. Baseball Hall of Fame inductee Ty Cobb had a brother who lived in Twin Falls. Cobb hosted an exhibition game at Twin Falls Athletic Park on Nov. 9, 1915, between a group of American League All-Stars and a team from the National League. Torn down in 1974, Twin Falls Athletic Park was located on the 500 block of Second Avenue South in Twin Falls, Idaho.

Timeline

Year–by–year records

Notable alumni

Bill Brenzel (1927)
Ed Coleman (1928)
Pete Daglia (1926)
Myril Hoag (1927) MLB All-Star
Lou Rosenberg (1926–1927)
Carl Zamloch (1926, MGR)

See also
Twin Falls Bruins players

References

External links
Baseball Reference

Defunct minor league baseball teams
Twin Falls, Idaho
Baseball teams established in 1926
Baseball teams disestablished in 1928
1926 establishments in Idaho
1928 disestablishments in Idaho
Defunct baseball teams in Idaho
Professional baseball teams in Idaho
Twin Falls County, Idaho